Commodore Ramon Abacan Alcaraz  (August 31, 1915 – June 25, 2009) was a Filipino World War II hero, Naval officer, and businessman best known as a recipient of the Silver Star for heroism and gallantry as part of the Offshore Patrol unit of the U.S. Army Forces in the Far East (USAFFE) during the Second World War; and as one of the earliest critics of the Marcos dictatorship within the Armed Forces of the Philippines. He is called the "father" of the Philippine Marine Corps, having organized it under the Magsaysay administration.

After graduating as a member of the Philippine Military Academy's Pioneer class of 1940, he joined the USAFFE's Offshore Patrol (which would eventually become of the Philippine Navy) and was given command of the motor torpedo boat Q-112 Abra.  In command of the Abra, he earned a Silver Star for an engagement on January 17, 1942, where the Abra shot down three low-flying Japanese planes which were attacking US and Filipino forces holed up in Bataan.

Alcaraz’ heroic actions led to him being imprisoned twice – first as a prisoner of war of the Japanese forces during their occupation of the Philippines in World War II, and second by the Presidential Security Group in 1972 after the declaration of Martial Law.

In 2013 the Philippine Navy named the frigate  in his honor – the first Philippine Navy ship to be named after a naval hero.

Early life and education
Alcaraz was born on August 31, 1915, in Quingua, Bulacan, Central Luzon, Philippines. Son of Domingo Lipana Alcaraz and Maxima Cruz Abacan. He is the oldest of two brothers, Marciano 'Rocky' (Capt., Philippine Navy, Ret.). He also had many sisters including Fe, Jacoba, Efigenia, and Lucila.

He entered the Philippine Military Academy at Teachers Camp, Baguio, Mountain Province, Philippines from June 15, 1936, to March 15, 1940, where he graduated with a Bachelor of Science degree. Alcaraz graduating among the 79 members (originally 120 cadets) from the Class of 1940 "The Pioneer Class". His class was the first group of graduates to finish the four year curriculum, as the previous curriculum was only three years.  Alcaraz was a writer for the PMA publication "Corps" and the bantam weight boxing champion in 1937 and 1938.

In 1941, he voluntarily joined and graduated from the Army's newly formed Offshore Patrol (OSP) Training School in Manila as part of the USAFFE forces.   In 1959, he went to United States to study at the Naval War College – Command Course at Newport, Rhode Island.

Military career

World War II 
After graduation, he assigned as a 3rd Lieutenant to the Philippine Commonwealth Army.  Nineteen months later, he volunteered to the newly formed Offshore Patrol unit of the Army and promoted as a 2nd Lieutenant with the OSP – Sea duty forces.  A few weeks after the Japanese attack on Pearl Harbor, he was promoted as a 1st Lieutenant after he was inducted into the U.S. Army Forces in the Far East (USAFFE).  He was the Commanding Officer of the Q-112 Abra, a 55 ft stepped-hull torpedo boat with aftward launch torpedo chutes built for the Philippine Commonwealth Government by the British shipbuilding firm John I. Thornycroft & Company – one of three "Q-boat" torpedo boats used by the Offshore Patrol (OSP) during the war.

On January 17, 1942, while on patrol along the east coast of Bataan in Manila Bay with Q-111 Luzon, they were spotted by nine Japanese dive bombers that was travelling towards the Bataan coastline.  The two torpedo boats turned to engage the Japanese enemy aircraft at full speed, and laying down accurate machine gun fire to shoot down three of the nine aircraft.  Their attack was successful that it forced the remaining damaged Japanese planes to return to their base, thus preventing them to complete their bombing mission on Bataan installations.  For their actions, he was immediately promoted to Captain by General MacArthur in Corregidor and awarded the Silver Star for heroism and gallantry in action.

On April 10, 1942, to prevent their boat capture by the Japanese, Captain Alcaraz's Q-112 Abra was scuttled at night near the shore of Paombong coast, four miles off Bataan's east coast. He and his crew floated to shore using bamboo poles but spotted by two search lights from Japanese patrol boats.

They were subsequently incarcerated in Malolos, Bulacan POW Camp. Alcaraz was shortly appointed as Head among the POW prisoners, and took care of his fellow POWs in that capacity but was likewise held accountable for any escape.  Alcaraz immediately used the sense of humor. Despite of his disheartened state, Alcaraz befriended the Japanese and joked often flattered his enemy's ego by asking to recount their battle victories. When new prisoners arrived with their hands tightly bound behind their back, Alcaraz would have Japanese soldiers untie them. Alcaraz felt responsible for keeping his fellow POWs alive and make their lives better the best way he could. It was during the many story-telling hours that his men enjoyed a respite from hard labor by just sitting and pretending to listen to the Japanese soldier's stories. 
At fall-in formations and other ceremonies, where POWs were required to hail "Banzai." Alcaraz would join in with his boisterous native version of "Bankay" (corpse), and the Japanese would roar with approval. By then, Alcaraz humor had become part and parcel of his escape plan, resulted in a less tortuous POW experience for his comrades compared with the unspeakable experiences the POWs endured at Camp O’Donnell. Notably, not a single death was registered at the Malolos POW camp.

After four months, Alcaraz was released after undergoing months thru an intensive "rejuvenation program" on August 10, 1942. He was paroled and instructed to be re-trained to join the Bureau of Constabulary at the Torres High School in Gagalangin, Tondo. In September 1942, he graduated as a police officer and was told that his first assignment was at Lanao del Norte province in Mindanao.  Alcaraz faked that he has malaria illness and was confined to a hospital in San Lazaro. This resulted that he would miss his transport ship to Mindanao which he was later reassigned to Bayombong, Nueva Vizcaya.

Establishment of the Philippine Marine Corps 

After the end of the war and of his ordeal as a POW, Alcaraz rejoined the OSP, which was eventually organized into the Philippine Navy.

In 1950, then-Defense Secretary Ramon Magsaysay ordered Alcaraz to go to the United States to study the organization of the U.S. Marines. Upon his return, he applied the things he learned to a recommendation to create a naval infantry force under the command of the Philippine Navy, and thus earned the distinction of being the "Father" of the Philippine Marine Corps.

Command of the Naval Operations Force against Smuggling 

In 1964 president Diosdado Macapagal placed Alcaraz in command of the Naval Operations Force (NOF) he had created to combat smuggling, particularly of foreign cigarettes. In the years immediately following World War II, traders in the Mindanao had begun smuggling foreign cigarettes from places like Borneo. But by the 1950s and 60s, these trade deals had been usurped by the network created by "smuggler king" Lino Bocolan of Tanza Cavite, who turned cigarette smuggling into a massively profitable racket.

After some initial frustrations, Alcaraz proved highly effective at the job, seizing about P750,000 worth of smuggled cigarettes each month in 1965 and getting him promoted to the naval rank of Commodore.

Conflict with President Ferdinand Marcos and Retirement 

Alcaraz was still in command of the anti-smuggling operations force in 1965 when the Philippine Presidential Elections of 1965 took place. During the campaign early in that year, President Macapagal was accused of allowing smuggling to continue by his opponent Ferdinand E. Marcos.  Macapagal attempted to diffuse these accusations by appointing Marcos as an "antismuggling czar," placing Alcaraz' command under Marcos' influence.  Marcos then won the election in November that year, becoming Commander in Chief of the Armed Forces upon his inauguration on December 30, 1965.

The rise of Ferdinand Marcos soon placed Alcaraz in conflict with his own commander in chief. Historian Alfred W. McCoy recounts in his book "Closer than Brothers" that: "Only days after his inauguration in December 1965, Marcos met secretly with smuggler-king [Lino] Bocalan and agreed to restrain the navy patrols for a share of the profits."

In a radio broadcast on January 11, 1966, Marcos included Alcaraz' name in a list of corrupt officials and relieved him of command.  Alcaraz protested this action and in doing so, also criticized the government's National Defense policy. Alcaraz was placed under investigation for these comments, and Undersecretary for National Defense Ernesto Mata gave him an ultimatum, saying he had a choice between retiring and be demoted. In Alcaraz' reply to Mata, he said:"You can reduce me to Apprentice Seaman… I don’t care. My father was a farmer, I can go back to being a farmer."

Bulacan Representative Rogaciano Mercado, who was acquainted with Alcaraz, eventually began a congressional exposé on the matter, and Marcos was forced to back off.  Vindicated but still angry, Alcaraz chose a session of the House Defense Committee to once again criticize the national defense policy and announce his retirement. Alcaraz was applauded as he left the witness stand, and he would thereafter continue to be a staunch critic of Ferdinand Marcos' administration.

After 26 years of active service, Commodore Alcaraz was placed on the retired list from active duty on January 22, 1966. He and his wife, who happened to be a pharmacist, then established a chain of drugstores called "Commodore Drug," in reference to Alcaraz' rank upon retirement.

1969 Advocacy work

When the campaign period for the 1969 Philippine presidential election began, Philippine World War II hero Terry Adevoso organized a lobbying group of retired officers supporting opposition candidate Sergio Osmeña Jr. Simply called the "Working Group," it called for "clean and honest elections" in light of what Time and Newsweek called the "dirtiest, most violent and most corrupt" election "in Philippine modern history," characterized by vote-buying, terrorism and ballot snatching.  As a former flag officer, Alcaraz was invited to the group.  This earned Alcaraz the ire of the administration, which initiated a retaliatory investigation of Alcaraz's real estate transactions, which would eventually lead to the closure of Commodore Drug.

Martial law arrest, exile, and overseas organizing work 

When Marcos declared Martial Law in 1972, the chief of Presidential Security took particular attention on Commodore Alcaraz' protest and advocacy work.  On November 15, 1972, the Commodore was brought to the PSG headquarters for interrogation but was eventually released.

In light of the arrest of opposition figures during Martial Law, notably including WWII guerilla hero Terry Adevoso, Alcaraz felt threatened, and decided to move to the United States, where he could continue to oppose the Marcos dictatorship by joining organizations against the administration in the Philippines.

Death 
Alcaraz died at Orange county on June 25, 2009. He is buried in Fairhaven Memorial Park, Santa Ana, CA, U.S.A.

Personal life 
He was married to Concepcion 'Conching' Dualan from Cavite in 1960. They have one child. He has children from his first marriage —two sons and three daughters.

Legacy

Formerly known as the United States Coast Guard Cutter (USCGC) Dallas, the Ramon Alcaraz was formally transferred to the Philippine government on 22 May 2012 (23 May 2012 Philippine standard time) under the auspices of the United States Foreign Assistance Act, with ceremonies held at the Federal Law Enforcement Training Center Pier Papa in North Charleston, South Carolina.

References

External links
Global Security.org, Philippine Navy History; 1939-1941: The Off Shore Patrol (OSP)
Philippine Navy Official Web Site
Philippine Military Academy Official Web Site
Armed Forces of the Philippines Official Web Site

1915 births
2009 deaths
Filipino military personnel
Philippine Military Academy alumni
Recipients of the Philippine Republic Presidential Unit Citation
Filipino military personnel of World War II
Martial law under Ferdinand Marcos
Philippine Military Academy Class of 1940